"Dickeye" is a song by American rock musician Jerry Cantrell. It was the third and final single from his 1998 debut album, Boggy Depot. "Dickeye" peaked at No. 36 on Billboard's Mainstream Rock Tracks chart.

Personnel
 Jerry Cantrell – vocals, guitars
 Rex Brown – bass guitar
 Sean Kinney – drums

Chart positions

References

External links
 [ Dickeye] at Allmusic

1998 singles
1998 songs
Jerry Cantrell songs
Songs written by Jerry Cantrell
Song recordings produced by Jerry Cantrell
Columbia Records singles